

Horst Stumpff (20 November 1887 – 25 November 1958) was a German general in the Wehrmacht during World War II. He was a recipient of the Knight's Cross of the Iron Cross.

On 1 January 1938 Stumpff was given command of the 3rd Panzer Brigade and on 1 March 1939 he was promoted to Generalmajor and led the brigade during the invasion of Poland. On 7 October 1939 he was appointed commander of the 3rd Panzer Division and in November 1940 he was given command of the new 20th Panzer Division and promoted to Generalleutnant on 1 February 1941. He led the division on the Eastern Front and on 29 September 1941 he was awarded the Knight's Cross of the Iron Cross, but he was moved to the Führerreserve shortly afterwards.

In April 1942 Stumpff was appointed as the military inspector of the recruiting area Königsberg. In July 1944 he became the Inspector General of the Panzer troops in the replacement army and he was promoted to General der Panzertruppe in 1944. He died in Hamburg aged 71.

Awards
 Knight's Cross of the Iron Cross on 29 September 1941 as Generalleutnant and commander of the 20. Panzer-Division

References

Citations

Bibliography

 

1887 births
1958 deaths
Generals of Panzer Troops
Recipients of the Knight's Cross of the Iron Cross
Reichswehr personnel
German Army personnel of World War I
Military personnel from Hesse
People from Giessen
German Army generals of World War II